Yakov Mikhailovich Yurovsky (– 2 August 1938) was a Russian Old Bolshevik, revolutionary, and Soviet Chekist (secret policeman). He was best known as the chief executioner of Emperor Nicholas II of Russia, his family, and four retainers on the night of 17 July 1918.

Biography

Early life
Yakov Mikhailovich Yurovsky was the eighth of ten children born to Mikhail Yurovsky, a glazier, and his wife  Ester Moiseevna (1848–1919), a seamstress. The Yurovsky family were Jewish. The historian Helen Rappaport writes that while the young Yurovsky was raised as a Jew, the family seemed to have later attempted to distance themselves from their Jewish roots; this may have been prompted by the prejudice toward Jews frequently exhibited in Russia at the time. Shortly before fully devoting himself to the cause of revolution, in the early twentieth century, Yurovsky converted to Lutheranism.

A watchmaker by trade, he lived for a short time in the German Empire in 1904.

After returning to Russia during the Russian Revolution of 1905, he joined the Bolsheviks. He received the party ticket no.1500 in the Krasnopresnenskaya organization. Arrested several times over the years, he became a devoted Marxist.

He was a Chekist for a short period of time in 1917.

Execution of the imperial family

On the night of 16/17 July 1918, a squad of Bolshevik secret police (Cheka), led by Yurovsky, executed Russia's last emperor, Nicholas II, along with his wife Alexandra, their four daughters–Olga, Tatiana, Maria, and Anastasia–and son Alexei. Along with the family, four members of the imperial household (court physician Eugene Botkin, chambermaid Anna Demidova, cook Ivan Kharitonov and footman Alexei Trupp) were also killed. All were shot in a half-cellar room (measured to be  x ) of the Ipatiev House in Yekaterinburg, a city in the Ural Mountains region, where they were being held prisoner. The firing squad comprised three local Bolsheviks and seven soldiers. It has been documented that the order to assassinate the imperial family came from Yakov Sverdlov in Moscow. 

According to Leon Trotsky's diaries, Lenin supported and decided upon the killing of the Tsar and his family. After Trotsky returned from the front (of the Russian Civil War) he had the following dialogue with Sverdlov:

To prevent the development of a personality cult of the former imperial family, the corpses were stripped and dismembered; then taken to the countryside, where they were initially thrown into an abandoned mineshaft. The following morning, when rumours spread in Yekaterinburg regarding the disposal site, Yurovsky removed the bodies.

Post-Civil War 
During and after the Russian Civil War, Yurovsky worked as a head of local Cheka in Moscow, then a member of Vyatka Cheka, head of Yekaterinburg Cheka (1919). In 1921, he worked in the Rabkrin and became Chief of the Gold Department of the Soviet State Treasury. Yurovsky achieved a solid reputation by combating corruption and theft. He also worked in management at the Polytechnical Museum starting in 1928 and became its director in 1930. He died in 1938 of a peptic ulcer.

Yurovsky was survived by a wife,  two sons,  and a daughter.

In 1920, a British officer who met Yurovsky alleged he felt "remorse and horror" over his role in the execution of the Romanovs.

Notes

References

Sources

External links 
Yurovsky's account of the execution of the Imperial Family
Yakov Yurovski, Executioner of the Romanovs
Юровский Я. М. Анкета для вступления в Общество старых большевиков (Yurovsky Old Bolshevik Society questionnaire)

1878 births
1938 deaths
People from Tomsk
People from Tomsk Governorate
Old Bolsheviks
Cheka
Communist Party of the Soviet Union members
Converts to Lutheranism from Judaism
Russian executioners
Emigrants from the Russian Empire to Germany
Russian Lutherans
People of the Russian Civil War
People of the Russian Revolution
Murder of the Romanov family
Regicides of Nicholas II
Soviet executioners
Russian mass murderers
Russian murderers of children
Russian people of Jewish descent
Deaths from ulcers
Burials at Novodevichy Cemetery